Bohmte is a municipality in the district of Osnabrück, in Lower Saxony, Germany. It is situated on the river Hunte, approx. 20 km northeast of Osnabrück. The foundation of today's Bohmte is a result of the regional reorganization of 1972, when the towns of Bohmte, Herringhausen-Stirpe-Oelingen and Hunteburg were consolidated.

Bohmte introduced a new road system in September 2007, designed to reduce the dominance of the motor vehicle.  It is hoped that the scheme, which is based on the shared space philosophy, will improve road safety in the town.

Politics

Parish council 

Apportionment at the parish council as of 2016 till 2021:

 CDU 13 seats
 SPD 12 seats
 FDP 2 seats
 Alliance 90/The Greens 3 seats
 Die Linke 2 seats

Town twinnings 
 Gützkow, Vorpommern-Greifswald, Mecklenburg-Vorpommern (since 1991)
 Bolbec, Seine-Maritime, France (since 1966)

Education and culture 

 Erich Kästner-Schule (Primary education for all religions)
 Christophorus-Schule (Primary education for the Roman Catholic)
 Grundschule Herringhausen (Primary education in Herringhausen)
 Oberschule Bohmte
 Wilhelm-Busch-Schule (Primary education and Hauptschule)
 Astrid-Lindgren-Schule (for the disabled)

Famous persons 
 Karl Janisch (born 1870 in Berlin; died 1946 in Schwegermoor) Architect
 Reinhold Tiling (born 13. Juni 1893 in Absberg/Franken; died 11. October 1933 in Osnabruck) Engineer, pilot and pioneer in rockets
 Rudolf Seiters (born 13. October 1937 in Osnabrück) German politician (CDU)

Regular festivals and meetings

Festivals

 "Spass auf der Straß" (Fun on the street) - last weekend in April
 Marksmen's festival in the Bohmterheide - Whitsuntide
 Marksmen's festival in Bohmte - first weekend in July
 Marksmen's festival in Stirpe-Oelingen - second weekend in July
 Marksmen's festival in Hunteburg - fourth weekend in July

Markets

 "Tag der offenen Tür" (Open doors day) at Bohmte/Bad Essen aerodrome - May Day
 Harvest festival in Herringhausen-Stirpe-Oelingen with harvest market - first weekend in September
 Bohmter Markt (Bohmte market) - fourth weekend in September
 North-German pony market in Hunteburg - second weekend in October

Christmas markets

 Sankt Nikolaus market in Bohmte - second Sunday of Advent
 Christmas market in Hunteburg - third Sunday of Advent

Famous buildings 
 Bohmte railway station
 Church of St John the Baptist
 Church of St Thomas
 Bohmter Kotten (cottage, inhabits the library)

References 

Osnabrück (district)